The Kharam people, also known as the Kharam Naga, are a Tibeto-Burmese ethnic group inhabiting the Northeast Indian state of Manipur. They are recognised as a Scheduled Tribe (STs) by India.

History
The word Kharam is believed to have derived from the words khwa ram which is translated as "That land". According to another definition, the word Kharam is a compound word of kha (south) and ram (land or place) which literally means ‘Southland’. The speakers of Kharam are mainly found in Kangpokpi district of Manipur and their language belongs to the Tibeto-Burman family of the language. The Kharam dialect is mainly spoken in Tuisenphai, Laikot Kharam, Laikot Phaijol, Tampak Kharam, New Keithel Manbi and Kharam Khullen villages in the Kangpokpi district of Manipur. Kharam has close affinities with other languages such as Kom, Purum, Aimol etc. The Kharams today are inhabited in the seven villages of Manipur of which the Kharam Pallen village is the oldest and largest village of Kharam people. Kangpokpi District.

References

Further reading
The Ethno-history of the Kharam Tribe of Manipur. Gina Shangkham, Centre for Manipur Studies, Manipur University, 1 January 2006 - Tribes - 381 pages

Scheduled Tribes of Manipur
Ethnic groups in Northeast India